Ceus or CEUS may refer to:

Department of Central Eurasian Studies (Indiana University)
Steward Ceus, born 1987, Haitian footballer
Contrast-enhanced ultrasound
CEUs, plural of Continuing education unit
 Central and Eastern U.S., in Active fault
 Coalition for a Solidary Europe, an electoral list of regionalist parties contesting the 2019 European Parliament election in Spain.

See also
CEU (disambiguation)